David Bowen may refer to:

 Dave Bowen (1928–1995), Welsh football (soccer) player
 Dave Bowen (Australian footballer) (1886–1946), Australian rules footballer
 David Bowen (cricketer) (born 1971), English cricketer
 David Bowen (pathologist) (1924–2011), Welsh pathologist
 David Bowen (Wisconsin politician), member of the Wisconsin State Assembly
 David James Bowen (1925–2017), Welsh scholar
 David John Bowen (1891–1912), Welsh boxer
 David Glyn Bowen (1933–2000), Welsh Congregationalist minister and missionary
 David R. Bowen (born 1932), U.S. Representative from Mississippi
 David Bowen, Felinfoel (1774–1853), Welsh Baptist minister

See also 
 David Bowens (born 1977), American football player